Gabriele Rotermund is a German rower, who competed for the SC Dynamo Berlin / Sportvereinigung (SV) Dynamo. She won the medals at the international rowing competitions.

References

East German female rowers
Year of birth missing (living people)
Possibly living people
European Rowing Championships medalists